The Clewiston News is a newspaper which serves Clewiston, Florida, USA, and all of Hendry County and the surrounding area. New and historic issues of The Clewiston News are available in the Florida Digital Newspaper Library.

Historic content
The early years of The Clewiston News contain critical primary source data on early Florida, Florida pioneers, Clewiston history, Harlem history, the Everglades, the Seminole Indians, and World War II aviation. The history of the Harlem Community before the 1960s is available through the Clewiston News. There is no written history of Harlem, which used to include an area owned by U.S. Sugar called Townsite.

The Clewiston News historic newspapers contain valuable information on the history of aviation, because John Paul Riddle, a pioneer in aviation training, airplane manufacturing, and airline operations, operated a flight school in Clewiston during World War II. (He also constructed and ran bases in Arcadia, Daytona Beach and in Obion County, Tennessee.) Riddle-McKay Aviation School of Florida, a private contractor for the United States government, built and operated bases, training approximately 26,000 pilots.

External links
 The Clewiston News freely available in full, searchable text and zoomable images from the Florida Digital Newspaper Library

See also 

 Clewiston Museum

Hendry County, Florida
Newspapers published in Florida